John Pugh Van Leer (February 27, 1825 – May 5, 1862) was an American military officer who served in the Union Army during the American Civil War. He commanded the 6th New Jersey Volunteer Infantry regiment and was killed during the Battle of Williamsburg. He was a member of the influential Van Leer family and his ancestors were some the earliest settlers of the Pennsylvania Colony.

Civil War
At the outbreak of the Civil War Van Leer joined the Union Army at Gloucester City, New Jersey with his family, and was commissioned as a Captain, promoted to Major and Lieutenant colonel of the 6th New Jersey Volunteer Infantry in 1861. He served under Brigadier General Francis E. Patterson and Joseph Hooker. Van Leer's regiment was the first fully equipped brigade to arrive in Washington, D.C. just before the First Battle of Bull Run. After his regiment built Fort Runyon, Van Leer lead 10 companies during Hooker's Virginia campaigns. He was killed during the Battle of Williamsburg on May 5, 1862 and interred at Mount Vernon Cemetery in Philadelphia. Before being killed in battle, his commission as a Colonel was on its way to him. His colonelcy would later be officially honored after his death.

Family
His great-grandfather Bernardhus Van Leer was an early settler of the Pennsylvania Colony. John's grandfather Isaac Van Leer fought in the American Revolutionary War along with his brother Samuel Van Leer. The Van Leer family were known for their success in the iron business and several historical locations in Pennsylvania are associated with the family including the Van Leer Cabin and the Van Leer Pleasant Hill Plantation.

Legacy
The Van Leer Post, No. 36 of the Grand Army of the Republic in Gloucester City, New Jersey, was named in his honor.

Van Leer built and leased houses for free black tradesmen and to people who were supportive of the free black community in Lima, Pennsylvania at a location now known as Van Leer Avenue.

Citations

Sources

External links
 
Isaac Van Leer, Generation 8.7 - Seventh Child of Bernhardhus Van Leer

1825 births
1862 deaths
Burials at Mount Vernon Cemetery (Philadelphia)
People from Camden, New Jersey
People of New Jersey in the American Civil War
Union Army colonels
Union military personnel killed in the American Civil War
Van Leer family